Klári Tolnay (born Rozália Klára Tolnay; 17 July 1914 – 27 October 1998) was a Hungarian actress. She received the Kossuth Prize in 1951 and 1952.

Life
Klári Tolnay (born Rózsi Tolnay) was born on 17 July 1914 in Budapest, as the daughter of István Tolnay and Eleonóra Siess. She spent her childhood in the small village of Mohora, Nógrád county, on the estate of her father. Finishing elementary school there, she continued secondary school studies in Balassagyarmat, two years at the school operated by Institutum Beatae Mariae Virginis in Nyíregyháza, finishing high school in Debrecen's School of Business. Singing and playing music since childhood, she followed the advice of newspaper editor János Bókay, and auditioned herself to prominent actors of the time, Gábor Rajnai, Jenő Heltai, and Sándor Hevesi. After these early attempts were not followed by desired results, she was mentored by Béla Gaál, thus starting her career as a film actress at the Hunnia Film Studio.

Her first notable role was in Meseautó, after which she was hired by the Vígszínház theatre in 1934, to perform smaller roles. In 1936 she married Ákos Ráthonyi, a director, giving birth to daughter Zsuzsanna 4 years later. After World War II ended in 1945, Ákos Ráthonyi left Hungary, with their daughter following after the 1956 revolution. Leaving the Vígszínház for the Művész Theatre in 1946-7, she met Iván Darvas, whom she later married (but divorced in 1958). In 1947, together with Gyula Benkő and István Somló, she was appointed as the co-manager of the Vígszínház theatre, where she was a major participant in restoring the institution to its pre-war glory. After the theatre was disbanded by the government in 1950, she joined the Madách Theatre, where she worked until her death on 27 October 1998. In later years, she also became a much sought-after dubbing actress, lending her voice to a great number of elderly female characters.

Filmography

 1934 Hacsek és Sajő – A két ültetvényes (short)
 1934 The New Relative
 1934 The Dream Car
 1934 Lila akác
 1935 Az okos mama
 1936 Légy jó mindhalálig
 1936 Tisztelet a kívételnek
 1937 Az én lányom nem olyan
 1937 A kölcsönkért kastély
 1938 Magda Expelled
 1938 Döntő pillanat
 1938 Azurexpressz
 1938 A hölgy egy kissé bogaras
 1938 Tiszavirág
 1938 Gyimesi vadvirág
 1939 Istvan Bors
 1939 Toprini nász
 1939 Hat hét boldogság
 1939 A nőnek mindig sikerül
 1940 Zavaros éjszaka
 1940 Erzsébet királyné
 1940 Egy csók és más semmi
 1940 Tóparti látomás
 1940 Vissza az úton
 1940 A szerelem nem szégyen
 1941 Havasi napsütés
 1941 Néma kolostor
 1941 Három csengő
 1941 Az ördög nem alszik
 1941 Gentryfészek
 1941 Kádár kontra Kerekes
 1942 Férfihűség
 1942 Keresztúton
 1942 Pista tekintetes úr
 1942 Katyi
 1943 Szerencsés flótás
 1943 Palócvirág (short)
 1943 Féltékenység
 1943 Menekülő ember
 1943 Rákóczi nótája
 1943 Ágrólszakadt úrilány
 1944 Idegen utakon
 1946 XIV. René
 1947 Beszterce ostroma
 1948 Tűz
 1949 Egy asszony elindul
 1951 Déryné
 1954 Rokonok
 1956 Mese a 12 találatról
 1956 Ünnepi vacsora
 1957 A tettes ismeretlen
 1957 Dani
 1958 Micsoda éjszaka!
 1959 Akiket a pacsirta elkísér
 1960 Fűre lépni szabad
 1960 Virrad
 1961 Mindenki ártatlan?
 1961 Nem ér a nevem
 1962 Angyalok földje
 1962 Fagyosszentek
 1963 Pacsirta
 1963 Fáklyaláng (TV film)
 1963 Hogy állunk, fiatalember?
 1964 Ők tudják, mi a szerelem (TV film)
 1964 Ezer év
 1966 Apa
 1966 Utószezon
 1967 The Testament of Aga Koppanyi
 1967 Az özvegy és a százados
 1968 Családi tűzhely (TV film)
 1968 Elsietett házasság
 1970 Hatholdas rózsakert
 1970 Szemtől szemben
 1970 Szerelmi álmok
 1971 A Danaida (TV film)
 1971 Reménykedők
 1972 Jó estét nyár, jó estét szerelem
 1972 Volt egyszer egy család
 1975 Asszony a viharban (TV film)
 1975 Hogyan viseljük el szerelmi bánatunkat? (TV film)
 1976 Ballagó idő
 1976 Fekete gyémántok
 1976 Mélosz pusztulása (TV film)
 1978 Drága kisfiam
 1978 Legato
 1978 Nem élhetek muzsikaszó nélkül
 1980 Kojak Budapesten
 1983 A csoda vége
 1983 Ők tudják, mi a szerelem (TV film)
 1983 Reumavalcer (TV film)
 1984 A vörös grófnő
 1985 The Red Countess
 1985 Bevégezetlen ragozás (TV film)
 1989 Vili, a veréb (voice)
 1994 Drága kisfiam

References

Sources
 László, Párkány. Tolnay Klári : egyes szám első személyben. Budapest:Minerva, 1998. 
 Zsolt, Kőháti. Tolnay Klári. Budapest: Múzsák Közművelődési Kiadó, 1987. OCLC 20613628
  – Kláry Tolnay in the Hungarian Theatrical Lexicon (György, Székely. Magyar Színházművészeti Lexikon. Budapest: Akadémiai Kiadó, 1994. ), freely available on mek.oszk.hu

External links

 Official site of Kláry Tolnay
 
 

1914 births
1998 deaths
Hungarian film actresses
Hungarian stage actresses
Hungarian voice actresses
20th-century Hungarian actresses